Brayan, Brian or Bryan Garcia or García may refer to:

Bryan Garcia (Brazilian footballer) (born 1992), left back a/k/a Bryan
Brayan García (born 1993), Honduran footballer
Bryan Garcia (baseball) (born 1995), American pitcher
Bryan García (Nicaraguan footballer) (born 1995), winger
Brian García (born 1997), Mexican footballer
Bryan García (Ecuadorian footballer) (born 2001), midfielder